Korenovsk is a town and the administrative center of Korenovsky District of Krasnodar Krai, Russia, located on the Beysuzhyok Levy River (a tributary of the Beysug)  northeast of Krasnodar. Population: 42,418 (2020),

History
It was founded in 1794 by Cossacks of the Black Sea Cossack Army as Korenovskoye, called so to commemorate a kurin of the same name in the Zaporozhian Host. Since the end of the 19th century, it had been known as the stanitsa of Korenovskaya.

During the Great Patriotic War, local Jewish community was murdered by an Einsatzgruppe. 

Town status was granted in 1961.

Korenovsk (air base), a Russian Air Force airbase is nearby.

Administrative and municipal status
Within the framework of administrative divisions, Korenovsk serves as the administrative center of Korenovsky District. As an administrative division, it is, together with four rural localities, incorporated within Korenovsky District as the Town of Korenovsk. As a municipal division, the Town of Korenovsk is incorporated within Korenovsky Municipal District as Korenovskoye Urban Settlement.

References

Notes

Sources

Cities and towns in Krasnodar Krai
Korenovsky District
Holocaust locations in Russia
Populated places established in 1794
1794 establishments in the Russian Empire